Shaanika Nashilongo Secondary School is a school in Okahao in the Omusati Region in Namibia. The school was founded in 1947 as a mission school of the Finnish Missionary Society. Previously named Ongandjera Secondary School, it has 31 teachers and 661 learners.

See also
 List of schools in Namibia
 Education in Namibia

References

Schools in Omusati Region